The Oblong Box is a 1969 British gothic horror film directed by Gordon Hessler, starring Vincent Price, Christopher Lee and Alister Williamson. This was the first film to star both Price and Lee.

Taking its title from the 1844 short story "The Oblong Box", it explores and combines several themes typical to the work of Edgar Allan Poe, such as premature burial and masked figures, with the non-Poe theme of voodoo ritual killings.

Plot

The film takes place in England in 1865. Having been grotesquely disfigured in an African voodoo ceremony for a transgression against the native populace, Sir Edward Markham (Alister Williamson) is kept locked in his room by his guilt-ridden brother, Julian (Vincent Price).

Tiring of his captivity, Sir Edward plots to escape by faking his death. With the help of the crooked family lawyer, Trench (Peter Arne), they hire witchdoctor N'Galo (Harry Baird) to concoct a drug to put Sir Edward into a deathlike trance. Before Trench has time to act, Julian finds his "dead" brother and puts him in a coffin (the title's "oblong box"). Embarrassed by his brother's appearance, Julian asks Trench to find a proxy body for Sir Edward's lying in state. Trench and N'Galo murder landlord Tom Hacket (Maxwell Shaw) and offer his corpse to Julian. After the wake, Trench and his young companion Norton (Carl Rigg), dispose of Hacket's body in a nearby river, while Julian has Sir Edward buried. Now free of his brother, Julian marries his young fiancée, Elizabeth (Hilary Dwyer).

Instead of being dug up by his associates, Edward is exhumed by graverobbers and delivered to Dr. Newhartt (Christopher Lee). Newhartt opens the coffin and is confronted by the resurrected Sir Edward. With his first-hand knowledge of Newhartt's illegal activities, Sir Edward blackmails the doctor into sheltering him. Suspecting his associates have betrayed him, Sir Edward then conceals his face behind a crimson hood and, searching for the witchdoctor, embarks on a vengeful killing spree.

Norton is first on Sir Edward's list and has his throat slit when he fails to tell him the witchdoctor‘s whereabouts. In between killings, Sir Edward finds time to romance Newhartt's maid Sally (Sally Geeson), but when Newhartt finds out about their affair, he discharges Sally and she goes to work for Julian. While searching for Trench, he is sidetracked by a couple of drunks who drag him into a nearby tavern. Here he ends up with prostitute Heidi (Uta Levka), who tries to steal his money, but Sir Edward kills her. The police get involved, and the hunt is on for a killer in a crimson hood.

Meanwhile, Julian has become suspicious about the body that Trench supplied to him, after his friend Kemp (Rupert Davies) finds it washed up on a riverbank. Julian confronts Trench, who tells him the truth about Sir Edward's "death". Soon after, Trench is dispatched by Sir Edward, but not before he tells him the whereabouts of N'Galo. Hoping he will cure him of his disfigurement, Sir Edward asks N'Galo for his help. Here Sir Edward learns the truth about his time in Africa: in a case of mistaken identity he was punished for his brother's crime of killing an African child. N'Galo fails to cure Sir Edward, and they fight; N'Galo stabs Sir Edward in the chest and Sir Edward retaliates by throwing hot liquid in his face. Sir Edward then returns to Newhartt's home, where Newhartt tends to his wound. Mistrusting Newhartt's medical treatment, Sir Edward slits his throat and sets off to confront his brother.

Back at the Markham ancestral home, Julian learns the whereabouts of his brother from Sally and leaves for Dr. Newhartt's home, only to find him near death. Meanwhile, Sir Edward arrives back home to find Sally, who is repulsed by her former lover's killing. Sir Edward drags her out onto the grounds of the house, pleading for her love. Julian arrives back home and gives chase with a double-barrelled shotgun. Out in the woods, Sally snatches Sir Edward's hood from him and his deformed face is revealed for the first time. She screams. Julian catches up and Sir Edward confronts him about his crime. As Sir Edward lurches forward, Julian shoots him with both barrels. Leaning over the dying Sir Edward, Julian is bitten by him on the hand.

Once again in his "oblong box", Sir Edward is resurrected by a vengeful N'Galo, but this time he is six feet under with no hope of escape. Meanwhile, back at the Markham mansion, Elizabeth finds Julian in Edward's old room. When she asks him what he's doing in there, he tells her it is his room, and turns to reveal that his face is becoming disfigured – Edward's bite has passed on the horrible disease to Julian. Elizabeth is flushed with fear, and the end credits roll over a close-up of her eyes widened with shock.

Cast

Production

The film was produced by the British subsidiary of American International Pictures. Price, Davies and Dwyer had recently appeared in Witchfinder General, under the direction of Michael Reeves, and on 18 November 1968, the four also began work on the Oblong Box. The original script had the Markham brothers as twins, both played by Vincent Price.

Christopher Wicking was bought in to do some additional dialogue. He says AIP were keen to put the film into production to take advantage of Witchfinders success and that they had also promised him When the Sleeper Wakes and a film about Christ coming to the modern day. Wicking says Oblong Box "was the carrot".

However, Reeves fell ill during pre-production, so Hessler stepped in and made a number of substantial changes. With the help of Christopher Wicking, he reworked the screenplay to incorporate the theme of imperial exploitation of native peoples in Africa. This theme gave the film a "pro-black" appearance that would later cause it to be banned in Texas.

The leading role of the film was given to character actor Alister Williamson, his first. Although he has the largest amount of screen time, more than either Price or Lee, his real voice is never heard (it was redubbed by another actor) and his face is covered for the majority of the film. His makeup was done by Jimmy Evans, whose other credits include Captain Kronos – Vampire Hunter (1972) and Hessler's Scream and Scream Again (1970).

Hessler says AIP insisted he use Hilary Dwyer.:
I don't know what the situation was, but they liked her and they kept pushing you to use certain actors. I guess the management must have thought she was star material or something like that.

Shooting took place at Shepperton Studios, with sets were designed by the art director George Provis. The score was composed by Harry Robertson, who later worked on several Hammer Horrors.

Reception

Box office
According to Hessler, the film was very successful and ushered in a series of follow up horror movies for AIP including Scream and Scream Again and Cry of the Banshee.

Critical
Rotten Tomatoes, a review aggregator, reports that 57% of seven surveyed critics gave the film a positive review; the average rating was 4.6/10.  A. H. Weiler of The New York Times wrote, "The British and American producers, who have been mining Edgar Allan Poe's seemingly inexhaustible literary lode like mad, now have unearthed The Oblong Box to illustrate once again that horror can be made to be quaint, laughable and unconvincing at modest prices."  Variety wrote, "Price as usual overacts, but it is an art here to fit the mood and piece and as usual Price is good in his part."

References

External links 

 
 
 

1969 films
1969 horror films
1960s historical horror films
British historical horror films
Films based on works by Edgar Allan Poe
American International Pictures films
Films directed by Gordon Hessler
Films set in 1865
Films set in England
Films set in London
Films set in Africa
Fratricide in fiction
Films shot at Shepperton Studios
Grave-robbing in film
1960s English-language films
1960s British films